The 8500 Tower is a 24-story high-rise office skyscraper in the city of Bloomington, Minnesota. It stands at a height of 381 feet, making it the 26th-tallest building in the state of Minnesota. It is also the tallest building in Bloomington, as well as in all of the suburban Minneapolis-St. Paul metropolitan area.

The building is part of the Normandale Lake Office Park, a five-building office complex located on the north end of Normandale Lake. The complex is considered to be at the center of "downtown" Bloomington - the business district that runs along the southern side of Interstate 494.

The building, along with the rest of Normandale Lake Office Park, was owned by Equity Group Investments from 2012 to 2014, when it was sold to MetLife. The sale was speculated to be the largest in the history of the Twin Cities metropolitan area, though an exact price was not publicly disclosed. In 2019, the property was again put up for sale.

See also
List of tallest buildings in Minnesota

References
Towers in Minnesota
Buildings and structures in Bloomington, Minnesota
Skyscraper office buildings in Minnesota
Office buildings completed in 1988

External links 

 Normandale Lake Office Park website